Castilleja salsuginosa is a species of flowering plant in the family Orobanchaceae known by the common name Monte Neva Indian paintbrush. It is endemic to Nevada in the United States, where it is known from two populations, one in White Pine County and another in Eureka County. There are only about 275 individuals.

It is entirely brown or purplish to gray in color. In June and July it bears inflorescences of cream and pink colored bracts and flowers. It is very similar to Castilleja nana. It is possible that it is part of that species.

This plant grows in two locations in Nevada's alkaline meadows. It grows around hot springs on salty, wet soils. Other plants in the habitat may include Sarcobatus vermiculatus, Chrysothamnus nauseosus, and Sporobolus airoides.

This rare plant faces several threats, including livestock, horses, pronghorn, off-road vehicles, geothermal development, land conversion, water diversion, and climate change.

References

External links

salsuginosa
Flora of Nevada